The 1965 Walker Cup, the 20th Walker Cup Match, was played on September 3 and 4, 1965, at Baltimore Country Club, Baltimore, Maryland. The event was tied at 11 matches each with 2 matches halved.

Great Britain and Ireland took an 8–3 lead after the first day after winning six of the singles matches. They shared the second day foursomes and needed just two win in the singles. Gordon Cosh won his match but it seemed that the other seven matches would be lost. However Clive Clark, two down with three to play, halved his match. The overall match was tied at 11 each with the United States retaining the Cup, having won in 1963. Joe Carr, the Great Britain and Ireland playing captain, did not select himself for any of the matches.

Format
The format for play on Friday and Saturday was the same. There were four matches of foursomes in the morning and eight singles matches in the afternoon. In all, 24 matches were played.

Each of the 24 matches was worth one point in the larger team competition. If a match was all square after the 18th hole extra holes were not played. The team with most points won the competition. If the two teams were tied, the previous winner would retain the trophy.

Teams
Ten players for the United States and Great Britain & Ireland participated in the event. Great Britain & Ireland had a playing captain, while the United States had a non-playing captain.

United States

Captain: Johnny Fischer
Don Allen
Deane Beman
William C. Campbell
Dave Eichelberger
Downing Gray
John Mark Hopkins
Dale Morey
Billy Joe Patton
Ed Tutwiler
Ed Updegraff

Great Britain & Ireland
 & 
Playing captain:  Joe Carr
 Michael Bonallack
 Clive Clark
 Gordon Clark
 Gordon Cosh
 Rodney Foster
 Michael Lunt
 Sandy Saddler
 Ronnie Shade
 Peter Townsend

Friday's matches

Morning foursomes

Afternoon singles

Saturday's matches

Morning foursomes

Afternoon singles

References

Walker Cup
Golf in Maryland
Walker Cup
Walker Cup
Walker Cup